Afiniti Ltd., also called Afiniti, is an American multinational data and software company. Founded in 2005, Afiniti is focused on developing artificial intelligence for use in customer call centers. Afiniti is a unicorn company with a valuation of $1.6 billion in 2017.

History

2005–2016
In 2005, Afiniti was founded in Washington, D.C. by Zia Chishti, a former Morgan Stanley investment banker who had previously co-founded Align Technology, with the help of his partners at The Resource Group (TRG), Hasnain Aslam and Mohammed Khaishgi of the Kheshgi family. In 2008, the company submitted several patents related to matching caller data with computer models, which were granted in 2014. In late 2016, the company confidentially filed for a potential future initial public offering (IPO). Around that time, Afiniti also introduced software to run phone numbers "through a variety of databases prior to when a call center agent picks up the phone." The system referred to around 100 databases to gather information on callers, including from public profiles such as Twitter. According to Fortune magazine, the system operated on "the idea that it's possible, using thousands of call records, to determine which agents perform best with certain type of customers."

2017–2018
According to The Wall Street Journal, by January 2017, the company had installed its artificial intelligence software in around 150 call centers for several dozen companies, among them Caesars Entertainment Corporation and Sprint. In 2017, the company closed a fourth round of venture funding, bringing in $80 million from investors such as GAM, McKinsey & Co, Elisabeth Murdoch, and John Browne. The round brought the company's total funding raised since its inception to $100 million. Afiniti signed a deal with Huawei in September 2017 and Avaya in April 2018.

In January 2018, Fortune magazine included Afiniti on its list of the 100 companies "leading the way in A.I." By June 2018, Afiniti had been active in 18 countries and had 1,000 employees. According to Chishti, the company saw 100 percent revenue growth each year between 2013 and 2017.

2021
In November 2021, Zia Chishti stepped down as chairman, chief executive officer and director following allegations of sexual assault to an employee made in testimony to the United States House Committee on the Judiciary. The former UK prime minister David Cameron left his role as chair of Afiniti's advisory board following the allegations.

Services and technology
According to the company, its software uses AI to boost company's efficiency by "predicting interpersonal behavior" between the callers and agents. VentureBeat explains that "when a customer calls into a call center, Afiniti matches their phone number — either landline or cellphone — with any information tied to it from up to 100 databases. These databases carry purchase history, income, and other demographic information."<ref  Data on customers is collected from the customers and from data brokers. Afiniti does not charge for the software or service itself, but instead takes a percentage of any proven revenue increases resulting from use of the software.

See also
List of unicorn startup companies

References

External links
afiniti.com

Software companies based in Washington, D.C.
Software companies of the United States
2005 establishments in the United States
2005 establishments in Washington, D.C.
Companies established in 2005